Decatur is a village in Van Buren County, Michigan, United States. The population was 1,819 at the 2010 census. The village is located within Decatur Township.

History
Decatur Township and the Village of Decatur are named after Stephen Decatur, Jr., celebrated as a hero of the War of 1812.

Decatur was founded in 1847 and incorporated as a village in 1861.

Churches
Decatur contains many denominations and is home to a variety of churches, including one of its oldest churches, Decatur First Reformed Church.

Geography

Demographics

2010 census
As of the census of 2010, there were 1,819 people, 701 households, and 448 families living in the village. The racial makeup of the village was 87.6% White, 2.7% African American, 1.2% Native American, 0.3% Asian, 0.1% Pacific Islander, 4.1% from other races, and 4.0% from two or more races. Hispanic or Latino of any race were 9.4% of the population.

There were 701 households, of which 36.8% had children under the age of 18 living with them, 40.1% were married couples living together, 18.3% had a female householder with no husband present, 5.6% had a male householder with no wife present, and 36.1% were non-families. 30.0% of all households were made up of individuals, and 12% had someone living alone who was 65 years of age or older. The average household size was 2.55 and the average family size was 3.10.

The median age in the village was 34.6 years. 28.1% of residents were under the age of 18; 8.3% were between the ages of 18 and 24; 26.9% were from 25 to 44; 23.2% were from 45 to 64; and 13.5% were 65 years of age or older. The gender makeup of the village was 47.6% male and 52.4% female.

2000 census
As of the census of 2000, there were 1,838 people, 725 households, and 458 families living in the village. The racial makeup of the village was 87.65% White, 5.82% African American, 1.41% Native American, 0.27% Asian, 1.85% from other races, and 2.99% from two or more races. Hispanic or Latino of any race were 4.08% of the population.

There were 725 households, out of which 33.2% had children under the age of 18 living with them, 42.5% were married couples living together, 15.3% had a female householder with no husband present, and 36.7% were non-families. 31.9% of all households were made up of individuals, and 14.2% had someone living alone who was 65 years of age or older.  The average household size was 2.49 and the average family size was 3.09.

In the village, the population was spread out, with 28.6% under the age of 18, 8.8% from 18 to 24, 28.9% from 25 to 44, 18.9% from 45 to 64, and 14.8% who were 65 years of age or older.  The median age was 34 years. For every 100 females, there were 92.3 males.  For every 100 females age 18 and over, there were 83.9 males.

The median income for a household in the village was $30,550, and the median income for a family was $36,417. Males had a median income of $27,566 versus $20,703 for females. The per capita income for the village was $14,098.  About 18.2% of families and 20.9% of the population were below the poverty line, including 31.7% of those under age 18 and 12.0% of those age 65 or over.

Education
Decatur is part of the Decatur Public Schools district. The district has one elementary school, one middle school, and one high school.

Notable people

 Edgar Bergen, an American actor and radio performer, best known as a ventriloquist.
 Charles H. Mahoney, the first African American to serve as a delegate to the United Nations.

See also

 List of villages in Michigan

References

External links

 

Villages in Van Buren County, Michigan
Villages in Michigan
1859 establishments in Michigan
Populated places established in 1859